Alfred Atkinson VC (6 February 1874 – 21 February 1900) was an English recipient of the Victoria Cross, the highest and most prestigious award for gallantry in the face of the enemy that can be awarded to British and Commonwealth forces.

Alfred was born in Armley in Leeds and was the son of James Harland Atkinson (born ~1830 at Kirkby Malzeard, Yorkshire) and Margaret Mansfield (born ~1833 at Leeds, Yorkshire)  who were married in Leeds on 4 June 1855. James Harland Atkinson was a Shoeing Smith in the Royal Artillery.

He was 26 years old, and a sergeant in the 1st Battalion, The Princess of Wales's Own (Yorkshire Regiment), British Army during the Second Boer War when the following deed took place on 18 February 1900 during the Battle of Paardeberg, South Africa for which he was (posthumously) awarded the VC:

His Victoria Cross is displayed at the Green Howards Museum, Richmond, Yorkshire, England.

References

Further reading
Monuments to Courage (David Harvey, 1999)
The Register of the Victoria Cross (This England, 1997)
Victoria Crosses of the Anglo-Boer War (Ian Uys, 2000)

External links
Burial location of Alfred Atkinson "Transvaal, South Africa"
Location of Alfred Atkinson's Victoria Cross "Green Howards Museum, Richmond"

Various official names of the Regiment Evolution of a Name

British recipients of the Victoria Cross
Second Boer War recipients of the Victoria Cross
1874 births
1900 deaths
Green Howards soldiers
British Army personnel of the Second Boer War
Military personnel from Leeds
People from Armley
British military personnel killed in the Second Boer War
British Army recipients of the Victoria Cross